Believe It may refer to:

 Believe It (album), a 1975 album by the New Tony Williams Lifetime
 "Believe It" (Meek Mill song), 2013
 "Believe It" (White Lies song), 2018
 "Believe It" (PartyNextDoor and Rihanna song), 2020
 Believe It (horse), an American bred racehorse
 Believe It (comics), an Unbelievable Gwenpool storyline, 2016
 Believe it (catchphrase) Used by the anime character Naruto Uzumaki